The KZN Autumn Series was a series of road cycling races held in Pietermaritzburg and Margate, KwaZulu-Natal in South Africa between 27 April and 3 May 2015. The series comprised three races, the Freedom Day Classic on 27 April, the Mayday Classic on 1 May, and the Hibiscus Cycle Classic on 3 May. Both the Freedom Day Classic and the Hibiscus Cycle Classic included women's races, while all three men's races formed part of the 2015 UCI Africa Tour.

Freedom Day Classic

Men's race

Women's race

Mayday Classic

Hibiscus Cycle Classic

Men's race

Women's race

References

2015 in South African sport
2015 in men's road cycling
2015 in women's road cycling
UCI Africa Tour races